The Germany women's national football team represents Germany in international women's football. The team is fielded by the German Football Association (DFB), the governing body of football in Germany, and competes as a member of the Union of European Football Associations (UEFA). Germany competed in their first international match on 10 November 1982, a 5–1 win in a friendly against Switzerland. In total, 235 players have appeared for the national team since its inception.

Germany have competed in numerous friendly and competitive competitions, and all players who have played in a match, either as a member of the starting eleven or as a substitute, are listed below. Each player's details include her playing position while with the team, the number of caps earned and goals scored in all international matches, and details of the first and most recent matches played in. The players in the list are ordered alphabetically using their most common name. All statistics are correct up to and including the match played on 24 June 2022 against Switzerland.

Key

Players

See also
 List of East Germany women's international footballers
 List of Germany international footballers
 List of East Germany international footballers
 List of Saarland international footballers

Notes

References

External links
 

 
Germany
International footballers
International footballers
international footballers
Association football player non-biographical articles